Utricularia reticulata is a medium to large-sized, probably annual carnivorous plant that belongs to the genus Utricularia. It is native to India and Sri Lanka. It is also a common weed found in rice fields. U. reticulata was originally described by James Edward Smith in 1808, but he did not cite a specimen and instead referred to a botanical print in Hendrik van Rheede's 1689 Hortus Malabaricus.

See also 
 List of Utricularia species

References 

Carnivorous plants of Asia
Flora of India (region)
Flora of Sri Lanka
reticulata